Mahmuna is a female Arabic name. Variant spellings in English include: Maimoonah, Maymoonah, Maymuna(h), Maimouna and Mehmoona, Maimuna, Mymouna(h), Mymona. Its meaning is 'auspicious, blessed'.

Notable people 
Maymuna Abu Bakr, Yemeni poet, songwriter, and television director
Maïmouna Hélène Diarra, Malian actress
Maimouna Diarra, Senegalese basketball player
Maïmouna Doucouré, French film director
Maïmouna Guerresi, Italian artist
Maïmouna Gueye, Franco-Senegalese actress
Maymunah bint al-Harith, wife of the Islamic prophet Muhammad
Maymunah Kadiri, Nigerian mental health advocate
Maïmouna Kane, Senegalese jurist and politician
Maimouna N'Diaye, French actress
Maïmouna Sourang Ndir, Senegalese politician
Maïmouna Ndoye Seck, Senegalese politician
Maïmouna Togola, Malian footballer
Maimouna Traoré, Malian footballer
Maimouna Youssef, American singer, songwriter, and rapper

See also
Majmuna Stone

References

Arabic feminine given names